Nathan Phillips  (November 7, 1892 – January 7, 1976) was a Canadian politician who served as the 53rd mayor of Toronto from 1955 to 1962. A lawyer by training, Phillips was first elected to Toronto City Council in 1926. He is the city's first Jewish mayor, ending an unbroken string of Protestant mayors.

Early life

Born in Brockville, Ontario, the son of Jacob Phillips and Mary Rosenbloom, he was educated in public and high schools in Cornwall, Ontario. In 1908, he articled with the Cornwall lawyer, Robert Smith, who later would be named to the Supreme Court of Canada. He graduated from Osgoode Hall Law School in 1913 and was called to the Ontario Bar in 1914. He practised law in Toronto and was appointed a King's Counsel in 1929. He was an honorary member of the Fraternal Order of Eagles, Aerie 2311, the Maple Leaf Aerie. He married Esther Lyons (1893–1983) in 1917 and they had three children: Lewis, born on December 30, 1917; Madeline, born on October 20, 1919, and Howard, born on November 30, 1921. Tragically on Mother's Day, May 12, 1929, Lewis was struck by an automobile and instantly killed. Howard Phillips was a City of Toronto alderman for Ward 3 from 1949 to 1956.

Political career

Federal and provincial politics 
Phillips was a member of the Conservative Party having been involved in founding the Ontario Conservative Party's youth wing and then having run as the Conservative candidate in Spadina in the 1935 federal election. He placed second. Later, Phillips also ran unsuccessfully in St. Andrew riding during the 1937 and 1948 provincial elections.

Municipal politics
Phillips was first elected to Toronto City Council in 1926 and was the first Toronto mayor of the Jewish faith. He served as mayor from 1955 until he lost to Donald Summerville in 1962, after thirty-six years in municipal politics. Phillips was dubbed "mayor of all the people". Until his election, all mayors had been Protestant and every mayor since the appointment of Thomas David Morrison in 1836 had been a member of the Orange Order, which dominated the city's political and business establishment. Phillips became mayor by defeating Mayor Leslie Howard Saunders, an Orangeman, who had stoked controversy with his sectarian comments about the importance of the Battle of the Boyne. Phillips's victory marked a turning point in Toronto history and its transformation from a Protestant, staunchly British and conservative city to a modern multicultural metropolis.

On March 23, 1959, Phillips welcomed exiled King Peter II of Yugoslavia on an official tour to City Hall.

Under Phillips's direction, the City of Toronto pursued an aggressive agenda of demolishing heritage structures throughout the city in order to 'modernize.' Large blocks of downtown were purchased and razed and many landmark buildings and neighbourhoods were destroyed such as the University Avenue Armouries, the Chorley Park estate, the General Post Office (built in 1873 in the Second Empire style, and the most expensive federal building ever constructed in Canada), Toronto's original Jewish community (called the Ward) around Old City Hall, and Toronto's Old Chinatown. Old City Hall itself narrowly escaped being demolished and Fort York survived a council vote to be moved to Coronation Park after the Toronto Historical Association rallied public support.

Nathan Phillips is best remembered as the driving force behind the construction of Toronto's New City Hall and the selection of a striking avant-garde design by Finnish architect Viljo Revell.

Phillips served five terms as mayor before being defeated in the 1962 Toronto municipal election by Donald Dean Summerville.

Legacy 
Nathan Phillips Square was named in his honour.

In 2005, a proposal to sell the naming rights to Nathan Phillips Square unleashed a storm of opposition from many Torontonians, including Phillips's grandchildren. The proposal was withdrawn.

References

 
Nathan Phillips. Mayor of All the People McClelland and Stewart, 1967

1892 births
1976 deaths
Lawyers in Ontario
Canadian King's Counsel
Conservative Party of Canada (1867–1942) candidates for the Canadian House of Commons
Progressive Conservative Party of Ontario candidates in Ontario provincial elections
Mayors of Toronto
Metropolitan Toronto councillors
People from Brockville
Jewish mayors of places in Canada